The First Carib War (1769 – 1773) was a military conflict between the Carib inhabitants of Saint Vincent and British military forces supporting British efforts at colonial expansion on the island.

Led primarily by Black Carib chieftain Joseph Chatoyer, the Caribs successfully defended the windward side of the island against a military survey expedition in 1769, and rebuffed repeated demands that they sell their land to representatives of the British colonial government.  Frustrated by what they saw as intransigence, the British commissioners launched a full-scale military assault on the Caribs in 1772 with the objective of subjugating and deporting them from the island.

British unfamiliarity with the windward lands of the island and effective Carib defence of the island's difficult mountain terrain blunted the British advance, and political opposition to the expedition in London  prompted an enquiry and calls for it to be ended.  With military matters at a stalemate, a peace agreement was signed in 1773 that delineated boundaries between British and Carib areas of the island.

See also
 Second Carib War

References

Conflicts in 1769
Conflicts in 1770
Conflicts in 1771
Conflicts in 1772
Conflicts in 1773
Wars involving Saint Vincent and the Grenadines
Wars involving Great Britain
Garifuna
1760s in the Caribbean
1770s in the Caribbean
1769 in the Caribbean
1770 in the Caribbean
1771 in the Caribbean
1772 in the Caribbean
1773 in the Caribbean
1769 in the British Empire
1770 in the British Empire
1771 in the British Empire
1772 in the British Empire
1773 in the British Empire